Foxham may refer to:

 Foxham, Groningen, a town near Groningen in the Netherlands
 Foxham, Wiltshire, a village in Wiltshire, England